K. Selvaperunthagai is an Indian politician and the State Chairman of the Tamil Nadu Congress Committee's section of SC Department. He is currently MLA from Sriperumbudur Constituency.

Early life

K.Sevaperunthagai was born on 14 April 1964 at Manimangalam Village, Sriperumbudur, Tamil Nadu. His Parents were Kuppusamy and Rasammal.

He did his Bachelor of Law at Sri Venkateswara University, Tirupati and MA at Madras University

Political career
He was elected to the Tamil Nadu Legislative Assembly from Mangalore constituency in the 2006 Tamil Nadu Assembly elections as a member of the party Viduthalai Chiruthaigal Katchi. After that, due to a disagreement with Thirumavalavan, he left the VCK and joined Congress.

Member of Legislative Assembly 
He is currently elected Member of Legislative Assembly (MLA) to the 2021 Tamil Nadu Assembly elections from Sriperumbudur Assembly constituency on behalf of the Indian National Congress and has been elected as the Leader of the Legislative Assembly of the Congress Party.
On 25 June 2021, he was unanimously nominated as Chairperson of the Public Accounts Committee of Tamil Nadu Legislative Assembly. On 24 July 2021, He was appointed as a member of All party SC/ST Welfare Committee, Government of Tamil Nadu by Chief Minister Thiru. M.K.Stalin

Committee assignments of 16th Tamil Nadu Assembly
 Chairperson (2021-23) Public Accounts Committee

Electoral Performances

References

1964 births
Living people
Indian National Congress politicians from Tamil Nadu
Tamil Nadu MLAs 2021–2026